U.S. Route 20A (US 20A) is a  east–west alternate route of US 20 located in northwest Ohio. The western terminus of the route is at US 20 southwest of Pioneer, and the eastern terminus is at US 20 in Maumee, southwest of Toledo.

Route description

The route runs parallel to the Ohio Turnpike (Interstate 80/Interstate 90, I-80/I-90) for much of its length, and intersects the turnpike at exit 13 northeast of Montpelier in Holiday City.

History
The current US 20A was designated U.S. Route 20S in 1932, which replaced State Route 271 which had run from US 20 south to Montpelier, truncated Ohio State Route 107, joined Ohio State Route 2, and followed a road formerly not on the state highway system through most of Lucas County. It became US 20A in 1935. US 20A was moved to its current location along SR 15 from State Routes 576 and 107 in 1964. (107 then reclaimed some of the miles that had been taken from it in 1932.) In the 1950s, part of the road east of Swanton was abandoned to make way for the Toledo Express Airport.

Major junctions

References

External links

20A (Ohio)
A (Ohio)
20A
Transportation in Williams County, Ohio
Transportation in Fulton County, Ohio
Transportation in Lucas County, Ohio